The Cilentan dialect (in , in Cilentan:  or ) is a Neapolitan dialect spoken in the area of Cilento, located in the southern part of the Province of Salerno, Campania, Italy.

Influences
It has been influenced, especially in the Vallo di Diano and in central Cilento, by the Basilicata language as spoken in Potenza and part of its Province of Potenza. In the towns of northern Cilento close to the urban area of Salerno (for example Agropoli, Capaccio and Paestum), the language is mainly influenced by Neapolitan, more specifically by the Salernitan dialect. In the southern corner of Cilento, the language is largely influenced by Sicilian, particularly the Calabrian variety of Sicilian.

See also

Lucania
Cilento
Vallo di Diano
Cilentan Coast
Cilento National Park
Province of Salerno
Irpinian dialect

Neapolitan language
Cilento